You Make Me Feel Like Dancing is the 28th album released by the Australian children's music group the Wiggles. Its title track features Leo Sayer, who wrote and performed the original song from 1976. It also features Australian country musician Troy Cassar-Daley. The CD was released on 8 May 2008, and won the Aria for Best Children's Album.

Track list
Introduction (spoken)
You Make Me Feel Like Dancing (featuring Leo Sayer) 
Dr. Knickerbocker 
A Sailor Went to Sea/Hornpipe (instrumental) 
Old Dan Tucker (featuring Troy Cassar-Daley) 
One Finger One Thumb
The Shimmie Shake! 
Two Little Dickie Birds
Turkey in the Straw (featuring Troy Cassar-Daley) 
The Mooche (instrumental)
The Fairy Dance (instrumental)
I Drive the Big Red Car 
(Are You Ready?) Do the Bus Stop 
Tales of the Vienna Woods (instrumental) 
Day-O (The Banana Boat Song)
La Bamba
Country Garden (instrumental) 
The Story of Thomas the Turkey 
Swedish Rhapsody (instrumental)

Video

The Wiggles have made their video, "You Make Me Feel Like Dancing," in June 2008.

Song list

 "You Make Me Feel Like Dancing" (featuring Leo Sayer)
 "Dr. Knickerboker"
 "A Sailor Went to Sea/Hornpipe" (instrumental)
 "Old Dan Tucker" (featuring Troy Casser-Daley)
 "One Finger, One Thumb"
 "The Shimmie Shake!"
 "The Fairy Dance" (instrumental)
 "Day-O (The Banana Boat Song)"
 "Swedish Rhapsody" (instrumental)
 "La Bamba"
 "I Drive the Big Red Car"
 "Are You Ready? (Do The Bus Stop)"
 "Follow the Leader"
 "Tales of the Vienna Woods" (instrumental)
 "To Have a Tea Party"
 "The Mooche" (instrumental)
 "First in Line"
 "Swinging on a Swing"
 "Country Garden" (instrumental)
 "We're All Friends"

References

External links

The Wiggles albums
The Wiggles videos
2008 video albums
2008 albums
ARIA Award-winning albums
Australian children's musical films